Obeid bin Said bin Rashid was the first Ruler of Dubai (today one of the United Arab Emirates) under the Al Bu Falasah, jointly leading a migration of the tribe from Abu Dhabi alongside Maktoum bin Butti bin Sohail. He ruled for three years prior to his death in 1836.

Migration 
Dubai is thought to have first been established as a fishing village on the Trucial Coast in the early 18th century. It was then a tributary to the Bani Yas tribe of Abu Dhabi.

By 1820, the town was ruled on Abu Dhabi Sheikh Tahnun bin Shakhbut Al Nahyan's behalf by a regent, when the General Maritime Treaty of 1820 was signed between the sheikhs of the South Eastern Persian Gulf coast and the British. The regent, Saeed bin Saif bin Zaal, signed on behalf of his nephew, Sheikh Mohammed bin Hazza bin Zaal, who was at the time in his minority. Mohammed bin Hazza remained head man of Dubai until the arrival of the Al Bu Falasah in 1833, when he was 23 years of age.

By 1822, it was a town of some 700–800 residents.

The migration of some 800 members of the Al Bu Falasah was triggered by a coup which removed Sheikh Tahnun as Ruler of Abu Dhabi and the Bani Yas tribe. A subsection of the Bani Yas, the Al Bu Falasah disagreed with the actions of the new Ruler, Sheikh Khalifa bin Shakhbut Al Nahyan and moved north to Dubai, which at the time consisted of a settlement of some 250 houses at Shindagha and the Al Fahidi Fort on the other side of the Ghubaiba inlet. The migration would have been an arduous undertaking, and took place over some time throughout and following the pearling season of that year (typically May to November).

Obeid bin Said bin Rashid died of old age and was succeeded by Maktoum.

See also 
 Al Maktoum
History of the United Arab Emirates

References 

Maktoum family
History of Dubai
Rulers of Dubai
19th-century Arabs